Iva Majoli defeated Martina Hingis in the final, 6–4, 6–2 to win the women's singles tennis title at the 1997 French Open. Majoli became the first Croat to win a major title. This was the only major match Hingis lost in the 1997 season, preventing her from achieving the Grand Slam. Hingis was on a 35-match winning streak, dating to the start of the season in Sydney.

Steffi Graf was the two-time defending champion, but lost to Amanda Coetzer in the quarterfinals. It was the second consecutive major where Coetzer defeated Graf, after the 1997 Australian Open.

This tournament marked the major debut of future world No. 1 and seven-time major champion Venus Williams; she was defeated in the second round by Nathalie Tauziat.

Seeds

Qualifying

Draw

Finals

Top half

Section 1

Section 2

Section 3

Section 4

Bottom half

Section 5

Section 6

Section 7

Section 8

References

External links
1997 French Open – Women's draws and results at the International Tennis Federation

Women's Singles
French Open by year – Women's singles
French Open - Women's Singles
1997 in women's tennis
1997 in French women's sport